During the 2003–04 Italian football season, U.S. Lecce competed in the Serie A.

Season summary
U.S. Lecce finished the season in 10th position in the Serie A table. In other competitions, Lecce reached the quarter finals of the Coppa Italia.

Javier Chevantón was the top scorer for Lecce with 19 goals in all competitions.

Squad

Goalkeepers 
  Vincenzo Sicignano
  Andrea Panico
  Vukašin Poleksić

Defenders 
  Giuseppe Abruzzese
  Philippe Billy
  Cesare Bovo
  Arnaud Kouyo
  Erminio Rullo
  Cristian Silvestri
  Sebastiano Siviglia
  Lorenzo Stovini

Midfielders 
  Jorge Bolaño
  Marco Cassetti
  Drissa Diarra
  Guillermo Giacomazzi
  Cristian Ledesma
  Nicola Mariniello
  Max Tonetto
  Daniele Franceschini

Attackers 
  Valeri Bojinov
  Javier Chevantón
  Wilfried Dalmat
  Cedric Axel Konan
  Mirko Vučinić

Results

Serie A

References

U.S. Lecce seasons
Lecce